Hyllisia flavostictica is a species of beetle in the family Cerambycidae. It was described by Breuning in 1976.

References

flavostictica
Beetles described in 1976
Taxa named by Stephan von Breuning (entomologist)